Radley is a village and civil parish in Abingdon, Oxfordshire, England.

Radley may also refer to:

Places 
 Radley College, English public school in the village of Radley, Oxfordshire
 Radley railway station, a station on the Oxford-London serving Radley and Abingdon
 Radley, Indiana, unincorporated town in Grant County, Indiana, USA
 Radley, Kansas

People
 Alfred Radley (1924–2019), British clothing manufacturer
 Radley Balko (born 1975), American journalist, author, blogger, and speaker
 Radley Metzger (1929–2017), American filmmaker and film distributor
 Adrian Radley (born 1976), Australian swimmer
 Chuck Radley (1925–1977), Canadian footballer
 Clive Radley (born 1944), English cricketer
 Gordon Radley (1898–1970), British engineer at Dollis Hill, the Post Office Rsearch Station.
 James Radley (1885–1959), one of the first English aviators
 Jeffrey Radley (1930–1975), British archaeologist
 Kate Radley (born 1967), keyboard player for the British rock band Spiritualized
 Paul Radley
 Simon Radley (born 1965), British chef
 Victor Radley (born 1998), Australian professional rugby league footballer
 Yip Radley (1908–1963), professional ice hockey player

Characters
 Arthur "Boo" Radley, a character from the novel To Kill a Mockingbird

Other uses 
 Radley (company), handbag designer and company